The 2015–16 BYU Cougars men's basketball team represents Brigham Young University in the 2015–16 NCAA Division I men's basketball season. It is head coach Dave Rose's eleventh season at BYU and the Cougars fifth season in the West Coast Conference. The Cougars once again play their home games at the Marriott Center.

As a result of a scandal surrounding inappropriate benefits received by BYU starting guard Nick Emery from a BYU booster, the NCAA vacated all of BYU's wins for the 2015–16 and 2016–17 seasons with the exception of a 2015 win over Weber State in which Nick Emery did not play.

Before the season

Departures
Ten individuals left the BYU program following the 2014–15 season—four players graduated (including BYU's all-time scoring leader Tyler Haws), two others transferred, and three more left for missions and are expected to return in 2017–18. The remaining individual was assistant coach Mark Pope, who left to become the new head coach at Utah Valley.

Recruiting
BYU has one high school graduate joining the school for the 2015-16 season.

2014–15 return missionaries
BYU will debut three returned missionaries for the 2015–16 season. Nick Emery, Jakob Hartsock, and Braiden Shaw will all have their debut season for the Cougars after serving missions.

BYU will also see the return of two familiar faces who came to school for one season. Both Cory Calvert & Cooper Ainge return from their missions.

Walk-ons
In addition to Cooper Ainge returning from his mission as a walk-on, BYU will be joined by new walk-on Alan Hamson.

Transfers
On July 28, 2015, Elijah Bryant announced he would transfer to BYU from Elon. Bryant won the CAA Rookie of the Year title in the 2014-15 season. Bryant will redshirt the 2015-16 season and begin play with BYU as a Redshirt Sophomore in 2016-17.

2015–16 media

Nu Skin Cougar IMG Sports Network

KSL 102.7 FM and 1160 AM- Flagship Station (Salt Lake City/ Provo, UT and ksl.com)
BYU Radio- Nationwide (Dish Network 980, Sirius XM 143, and byuradio.org)
KTHK- Blackfoot/ Idaho Falls/ Pocatello/ Rexburg, ID
KMGR- Manti, UT
KSUB- Cedar City, UT
KDXU- St. George, UT

Roster
(Subject to change)

On November 20, Cooper Ainge, a Guard out of Wellesley, Massachusetts and son of Danny Ainge, announced he would leave the team to focus on his studies. On that same day Alan Hamson announced he would redshirt the current season.
On December 14, Cory Calvert announced he was leaving the team for the remainder of the season and would transfer from BYU.
On December 21, Jake Toolson was granted a medical leave from the team.

Schedule
The 2015–16 schedule begins with a Summer Trip to Spain and features matches against state rivals Utah, Utah State, and Weber State. BYU will also return to Hawaii in 2015 to participate in the Diamond Head Classic.
Matches airing on both BYUtv and Root Sports are BYUtv productions for the WCC. BYUtv is producing the game and airing it nationally while WCC Game of the Week affiliates air it regionally.

 Asterisk next to a score indicates a win that was forfeited due to NCAA-imposed sanctions (the only win not forfeited was December 5, 2015 against Weber State, in which Nick Emery did not play).

|-
|-
!colspan=8 style="background:#002654; color:white;"| Exhibition

|-
!colspan=8 style="background:#002654; color:white;"| Non-Conference Regular Season

|-
!colspan=8 style="background:#002654; color:white;"| WCC Regular Season

|-
!colspan=8 style="background:#002654;"| WCC Tournament

|-
!colspan=8 style="background:#002654;"| National Invitation Tournament

Game summaries

Eurocolegio Casvi
Starting Lineups: 
BYU: Chase Fischer, Kyle Collinsworth, Kyle Davis, Nate Austin, Corbin Kaufusi
Eurocolegio Casvi: Nicol Bermúdez De Castro, Jorg Sánchez Domínguez, Héctor Jiménez Redondo, Eduard Gómez Fernández, Walter Cabral

Albacete Basket
Starting Lineups:
BYU: Chase Fischer, Zac Seljaas, Kyle Collinsworth, Kyle Davis, Corbin Kaufusi
Albacete Basket: Georvys Elias Sayu, Juan Carlos Vilches, Diego Javier Fox Esm, Miguel Raez Cuenca, Jose Maria Lopez

European Basketball Academy
Starting Lineups: 
BYU: Chase Fischer, Nick Emery, Kyle Collinsworth, Jordan Chatman, Nate Austin
European Basketball Academy: Not listed

CB Castelldefels
Starting Lineups:
BYU: Chase Fischer, Kyle Collinsworth, Kyle Davis, Jordan Chatman, Corbin Kaufusi
CB Castelldefels: Not listed

Papa John's Cougar Tipoff
Broadcasters: Spencer Linton & Jarom Jordan
Starting Lineups: 
BYU White: Zac Seljaas, Jordan Chatman, Elijah Bryant, Braiden Shaw, Jakob Hartsock
BYU Blue: Chase Fischer, Nick Emery, Jake Toolson, Kyle Davis, Jamal Aytes

Exhibition: Arizona Christian
Broadcasters: Dave McCann, Jarom Jordan, & Jason Shepherd
Starting Lineups:
Arizona Christian: Bobby Gray, Brandon Newman, Chris Sterling, Jackson Helms, Mike Navar
BYU: Nick Emery, Zac Seljaas, Jake Toolson, Kyle Davis, Nate Austin

Exhibition: Alaska
Broadcasters: Dave McCann, Blaine Fowler, & Spencer Linton
Starting Lineups: 
Alaska Fairbanks: Alex Duncan, Bangaly Kaba, Joe Slocum, Travante Williams, Almir Hadzisehovic
BYU: Chase Fischer, Nick Emery, Kyle Collinsworth, Jake Toolson, Nate Austin

Utah Valley
Broadcasters: Spencer Linton, Blaine Fowler, & Lauren Francom
Series History: BYU leads series 1–0
Starting Lineups:
Utah Valley: Marcel Davis, Jaden Jackson, Konner Frey, Ivory Young, Andrew Bastien
BYU: Chase Fischer, Kyle Collinsworth, Jake Toolson, Kyle Davis, Corbin Kaufusi

Long Beach State
Broadcasters: Steve Quis & Brad Daugherty
Series history: BYU leads series 6–4
Starting Lineups: 
BYU: Chase Fischer, Kyle Collinsworth, Jake Toolson, Kyle Davis, Corbin Kaufusi 
Long Beach State: Nick Faust, Roschon Prince, Justin Bibbins, A. J. Spencer, Gabe Levin

Adams State
Broadcasters: Dave McCann, Blaine Fowler, & Spencer Linton
Series History: First Meeting
Starting Lineups:
Adams State: EJ Hubbard II, Joe Bell Austin, Shakir Smith, Kendyl Grover, Ante Mioc
BYU: Chase Fischer, Kyle Collinsworth, Jake Toolson, Kyle Davis, Corbin Kaufusi

Mississippi Valley State
Broadcasters: Dave McCann, Blaine Fowler, & Spencer Linton
Series history: Series even 1–1
Starting Lineups: 
Mississippi Valley State: Vacha Vaughn, Damian Young, Ta'Jay Henry, Kylan Phillips, Jabari Alex
BYU: Chase Fischer, Nick Emery, Kyle Collinsworth, Kyle Davis, Corbin Kaufusi

Belmont
Broadcasters: Dave McCann, Blaine Fowler, & Lauren Francom
Series History: First Meeting
Starting Lineups:
Belmont: Luke Austin, Taylor Barnette, Craig Bradshaw, Evan Bradds, Tyler Hadden
BYU: Chase Fischer, Nick Emery, Kyle Collinsworth, Kyle Davis, Corbin Kaufusi

Utah
Broadcasters: Ted Robinson, Bill Walton, & Lewis Johnson
Series history: BYU leads series 129–127
Starting Lineups: 
BYU: Chase Fischer, Nick Emery, Kyle Collinsworth, Kyle Davis, Corbin Kaufusi
Utah: Brandon Taylor, Jordan Loveridge, Kenneth Ogbe, Kyle Kuzma, Jakob Poeltl

Weber State
Broadcasters: Dave McCann, Blaine Fowler, & Spencer Linton
Series History: BYU leads series 30–10
Starting Lineups:
Weber State: Joel Bolomboy, McKay Cannon, Dusty Baker, Jeremy Senglin, Zach Braxton
BYU: Chase Fischer, Kyle Collinsworth, Jake Toolson, Kyle Davis, Corbin Kaufusi

Utah State
Broadcasters: Dave McCann, Blaine Fowler, & Spencer Linton
Series history: BYU leads series 139–92
Starting Lineups: 
Utah State: Darius Perkins, Shane Rector, Jalen Moore, Chris Smith, Elston Jones
BYU: Chase Fischer, Kyle Collinsworth, Jake Toolson, Kyle Davis, Corbin Kaufusi

Colorado
Broadcasters: Jim Watson & Lamar Hurd
Series History: Colorado leads series 16–6
Starting Lineups:
BYU: Chase Fischer, Nick Emery, Kyle Collinsworth, Kyle Davis, Corbin Kaufusi
Colorado: Wesley Gordon, Dominique Collier, George King, Josh Scott, Josh Fortune

Central Michigan
Broadcasters: Dave McCann, Blaine Fowler, & Lauren Francom
Series History: First Meeting
Starting Lineups: 
Central Michigan: Braylon Rayson, Rayshawn Simmons, Chris Fowler, Luke Meyer, John Simons
BYU: Chase Fischer, Nick Emery, Kyle Collinsworth, Kyle Davis, Corbin Kaufusi

Harvard
Broadcasters: Kanoa Leahey & Cory Alexander
Series History: BYU leads series 1–0
Starting Lineups:
BYU: Chase Fischer, Nick Emery, Kyle Collinsworth, Kyle Davis, Corbin Kaufusi
Harvard: Tommy McCarthy, Zena Edosomwan, Corey Johnson, Evan Cummins, Agunwa Okolie

New Mexico
Broadcasters: Kanoa Leahey & Cory Alexander
Series History: BYU leads series 76–55
Starting Lineups: 
New Mexico: Cullen Neal, Elijah Brown, Obij Aget, Sam Logwood, Tim Williams
BYU: Chase Fischer, Nick Emery, Kyle Collinsworth, Kyle Davis, Nate Austin

Northern Iowa
Broadcasters: Kanoa Leahey & Cory Alexander
Series History: First Meeting
Starting Lineups:
BYU: Chase Fischer, Nick Emery, Kyle Collinsworth, Kyle Davis, Nate Austin
Northern Iowa: Paul Jesperson, Matt Bohannon, Wes Washpun, Jeremy Morgan, Bennett Koch

Saint Mary's
Broadcasters: Roxy Bernstein & Corey Williams
Series History: BYU leads series 11–7
Starting Lineups: 
BYU: Chase Fischer, Nick Emery, Kyle Collinsworth, Kyle Davis, Nate Austin
Saint Mary's: Emmett Naar, Evan Fitzner, Dane Pineau, Calvin Hermanson, Joe Rahon

Pacific
Broadcasters: Glen Kuiper & Dan Belluomini
Series History: BYU leads series 6–4
Starting Lineups:
BYU: Chase Fischer, Nick Emery, Kyle Collinsworth, Kyle Davis, Nate Austin
Pacific: T.J. Wallace, Alec Kobre, Tonko Vuko, Jacob Lampkin, Ray Bowles

Santa Clara
Broadcasters: Roxy Bernstein & Corey Williams
Series History: BYU leads series 24–5
Starting Lineups: 
Santa Clara: Kai Healy, Jared Brownridge, KJ Feagin, Nate Kratch, Emmanuel Ndumanya
BYU: Chase Fischer, Nick Emery, Kyle Collinsworth, Kyle Davis, Nate Austin

San Francisco
Broadcasters: Dave McCann, Blaine Fowler, & Spencer Linton
Series History: BYU leads series 13–7
Starting Lineups:
San Francisco: Devin Watson, Uche Ogoegbu, Dont'e Reynolds, Chase Foster, Tim Derksen
BYU: Chase Fischer, Nick Emery, Kyle Collinsworth, Kyle Davis, Nate Austin

Gonzaga
Broadcasters: Beth Mowins & Brad Daugherty
Series History: Gonzaga leads series 8–5
Starting Lineups: 
BYU: Chase Fischer, Nick Emery, Kyle Collinsworth, Kyle Davis, Nate Austin
Gonzaga: Bryan Alberts, Domantas Sabonis, Josh Perkins, Eric McClellan, Kyle Wiltjer

Portland
Broadcasters: Tom Glasgow & Francis Williams
Series History: BYU leads series 13–1
Starting Lineups:
BYU: Chase Fischer, Nick Emery, Kyle Collinsworth, Kyle Davis, Nate Austin
Portland: Bryce Pressley, Alex Wintering, Jason Todd, Gabe Taylor, Ray Barreno

Loyola Marymount
Broadcasters: Dave McCann & Brad Holland
Series History: BYU leads series 8–4
Starting Lineups: 
BYU: Chase Fischer, Nick Emery, Kyle Collinsworth, Kyle Davis, Nate Austin
LMU: Adom Jacko, Brandon Brown, Steven Haney, Buay Tuach, Shamar Johnson

Pepperdine
Broadcasters: Dave McCann & Brad Holland
Series History: BYU leads series 9–7
Starting Lineups:
BYU: Chase Fischer, Nick Emery, Kyle Collinsworth, Kyle Davis, Nate Austin
Pepperdine: Jeremy Major, Stacy Davis, Kameron Edwards, Lamond Murray Jr., Jett Raines

Loyola Marymount
Broadcasters: Roxy Bernstein & Corey Williams
Series History: BYU leads series 9–4
Starting Lineups: 
LMU: Adom Jacko, Brandon Brown, Steven Haney, Shamar Johnson, David Humphries
BYU: Chase Fischer, Nick Emery, Kyle Collinsworth, Kyle Davis, Nate Austin

Pepperdine
Broadcasters: Beth Mowins & Brad Daugherty
Series History: BYU leads series 9–8
Starting Lineups:
Pepperdine: Jeremy Major, Stacy Davis, Kameron Edwards, Lamond Murray Jr., Jett Raines
BYU: Chase Fischer, Nick Emery, Kyle Collinsworth, Kyle Davis, Nate Austin

Saint Mary's
Broadcasters: Dave McCann, Blaine Fowler, & Spencer Linton
Series History: BYU leads series 11–8
Starting Lineups: 
Saint Mary's: Emmett Naar, Evan Fitzner, Dane Pineau, Calvin Hermanson, Joe Rahon
BYU: Chase Fischer, Nick Emery, Kyle Collinsworth, Jakob Hartsock, Kyle Davis

Pacific
Broadcasters: Dave McCann, Blaine Fowler, & Spencer Linton
Series History: BYU leads series 7–4
Starting Lineups:
Pacific: T.J. Wallace, Alec Kobre, Tonko Vuko, Eric Thompson, Ray Bowles
BYU: Chase Fischer, Nick Emery, Kyle Collinsworth, Jackob Hartsock, Kyle Davis

San Francisco
Broadcasters: Dave McCann &  Blaine Fowler
Series History: BYU leads series 14–7
Starting Lineups: 
BYU: Chase Fischer, Nick Emery, Kyle Collinsworth, Kyle Davis, Corbin Kaufusi
San Francisco: Devin Watson, Uche Ogoegbu, Ronnie Boyce, Dont'e Reynolds, Tim Derksen

Santa Clara
Broadcasters: Dave McCann & Blaine Fowler
Series History: BYU leads series 25–5
Starting Lineups:
BYU: Chase Fischer, Nick Emery, Kyle Collinsworth, Kyle Davis, Corbin Kaufusi
Santa Clara: Kai Healy, Jared Brownridge, KJ Feagin, Nate Kratch, Emmanuel Ndumanya

San Diego
Broadcasters: Roxy Bernstein & Corey Williams
Series History: BYU leads series 9–3
Starting Lineups: 
BYU: Chase Fischer, Nick Emery, Kyle Collinsworth, Kyle Davis, Corbin Kaufusi
USD: Olin Carter III, Vasa Pusica, Marcus Harris, Brett Bailey, Jito Kok

San Diego
Broadcasters: Dave McCann, Blaine Fowler, & Spencer Linton
Series History: BYU leads series 10–3
Starting Lineups:
USD: Olin Carter III, Vasa Pusica, Marcus Harris, Brett Bailey, Jito Kok
BYU: Chase Fischer, Nick Emery, Kyle Collinsworth, Kyle Davis, Corbin Kaufusi

Portland
Broadcasters: Roxy Bernstein & Corey Williams
Series History: BYU leads series 13–2
Starting Lineups: 
Portland: Bryce Pressley, Alex Wintering, D'Marques Tyson, Gabe Taylor, Ray Barreno
BYU: Chase Fischer, Nick Emery, Kyle Collinsworth, Kyle Davis, Corbin Kaufusi

Gonzaga
Broadcasters: Beth Mowins & Brad Daugherty
Series History: Gonzaga leads series 8–6
Starting Lineups:
Gonzaga: Kyle Dranginis, Domantas Sabonis, Josh Perkins, Eric McClellan, Kyle Witljer
BYU: Chase Fischer, Nick Emery, Kyle Collinsworth, Kyle Davis, Corbin Kaufusi

Santa Clara
Broadcasters: Dave McCann & Blaine Fowler (BYUtv)
Steve Quis, Casey Jacobsen, & Kelli Tennant (TheW.tv)
Series History: BYU leads series 26–5
Starting Lineups: 
Santa Clara: Kai Healy, Jared Brownridge, KJ Feagin, Nate Kratch, Emmanuel Ndumanya
BYU: Chase Fischer, Nick Emery, Kyle Collinsworth, Kyle Davis, Corbin Kaufusi

Gonzaga
Broadcasters: Brent Musburger & Fran Fraschilla
Series History: Gonzaga leads series 9–6
Starting Lineups:
BYU: Chase Fischer, Nick Emery, Kyle Collinsworth, Kyle Davis, Corbin Kaufusi
Gonzaga: Kyle Dranginis, Domantas Sabonis, Josh Perkins, Eric McClellan, Kyle Wiltjer

UAB
Broadcasters: Mitch Holthus & Corey Williams
Series History: BYU leads series 2–1
Starting Lineups:
UAB: Hakeem Baxter, Nick Norton, Chris Cokley, Robert Brown, William Lee
BYU: Chase Fischer, Nick Emery, Kyle Collinsworth, Kyle Davis, Corbin Kaufusi

Virginia Tech
Broadcasters: Mitch Holthus & Corey Williams
Series History: BYU leads series 3–0
Starting Lineups:
Virginia Tech: Shane Henry, Justin Robinson, Justin Bibbs, Jalen Hudson, Zach Leday
BYU: Chase Fischer, Nick Emery, Kyle Collinsworth, Kyle Davis, Corbin Kaufusi

Creighton
Broadcasters: Roxy Bernstein & Fran Fraschilla
Series History: BYU leads series 6–3
Starting Lineups:
Creighton: Khyri Thomas, Maurice Watson Jr., Cole Huff, James Milliken, Geoffrey Groselle
BYU: Chase Fischer, Zac Seljaas, Nick Emery, Kyle Davis, Corbin Kaufusi

Valparaiso
Broadcasters: Bob Wischusen, Fran Fraschilla, & Kaylee Hartung (ESPN)
Scott Graham & Kelly Tripucka (Westwood One)
Series History: Series even 1–1
Starting Lineups:
BYU: Chase Fischer, Nick Emery, Kyle Collinsworth, Kyle Davis, Corbin Kaufusi
Valparaiso: Keith Carter, Darien Walker, Shane Hammink, Vashil Hernandez, Alec Peters

References

2015-16
2015–16 West Coast Conference men's basketball season
2016 National Invitation Tournament participants
2015 in sports in Utah
2016 in sports in Utah